The Lache were an indigenous, agrarian people in the highlands of what is now central Colombia's northern Boyacá and Santander departments, primarily in Gutiérrez Province and García Rovira Province. They were part of the Cocuy Confederation and spoke Chibcha, trading predominantly with other Chibcha speakers, such as the Muisca, Guane, Pijao and Chitarero.  Trade included salt and textiles, as well as food stuffs. The Lache farmed maize, potatoes, quinoa and cotton, among other crops.

In the 17th century, Lucas Fernández de Piedrahita wrote of the habit of the Laches in bringing up younger male children as culturally female.

The name Lache is preserved in a barrio of Bogotá known as Los Laches.

Municipalities belonging to Lache territory 
The Lache inhabited the highlands of eastern Santander and northern Boyacá and a small part of northwesternmost Casanare.

See also 

Muisca
Conquest of the Lache, Chibcha, U'wa
Guane

References

Bibliography

Further reading

External links 
 

Andean civilizations
Indigenous peoples in Colombia
 
 
Extinct ethnic groups